Calamba may refer to:

 Calamba, Laguna, a city in the Philippines
 Calamba Poblacion, a barangay district in Calamba, Laguna
 Calamba Island, an island in the city of Calamba situated at the Laguna de Bay
 Calamba Institute, a private school in Calamba, Laguna
 Calamba railway station in Calamba, Laguna
 Calamba Claypot, a giant water pot in Calamba
 Calamba Doctors' Hospital, a hospital in Calamba, Laguna
 Calamba Premiere International Park, an industrial park in Calamba 
 Calamba Bayside National High School, a National High School in Calamba Bayside
 Calamba, Misamis Occidental, a municipality in the Philippines

See also
Kalamba, another name for tapayan earthen jars in the Tagalog language
Kalamba, a town in Kenya